Pleskodāle is a neighbourhood of Riga consisting mostly of private houses on the western side of the city. It borders the Zolitūde and Šampēteris neighbourhoods.

Neighbourhoods in Riga